Margaret Sekaggya is a Ugandan lawyer and human rights activist. She was born in Kampala 23 October 1949. In 1970, she began at Makerere University studying for a bachelor of laws degree. In 1990, she attained a master of laws degree from the University of Zambia. She has worked with the governments of Uganda, Zambia, and the United Nations. From 1996 to 2009, she as the chairsperson for the Uganda Human Rights Commission. In 1995, she had been appointed a judge of the High Court of Uganda. During this time, she was selected to oversee the Uganda Interim Electoral Commission. She also participated in the promulgation of the 4th Constitution of Uganda in 1995. During much of the 80s, she was based at the United Nations Institute for Namibia, readying Namibia's institutions for transition into independence. From 1978 to 1982, she was a magistrate based in Lusaka. From 2008 to 2014, Sekaggya was the United Nations special rapporteur for human rights defenders.

References

Year of birth missing (living people)
Living people 
Ugandan women lawyers
Ugandan human rights activists
United Nations special rapporteurs
20th-century Ugandan lawyers
21st-century Ugandan lawyers